Woodlawn is a census-designated place in Fairfax County, Virginia, United States. The population as of the 2010 census was 20,804. It was carved out of the Mount Vernon CDP beginning with the 2010 census, from the west it goes from Fort Belvoir to Little Hunting Creek stretching along U.S. Route 1 on the south and Huntley Meadows Park on the north. Historic Woodlawn Plantation occupies the southwest corner. Fairfax County Park Authority operates neighborhood parks in the area.

Education

Fairfax County Public Schools operates Woodlawn and Mount Vernon Woods Elementary Schools within the area.

References

Census-designated places in Fairfax County, Virginia
Washington metropolitan area
Census-designated places in Virginia